Ehara is a Japanese surname. Notable people with the surname include:

, Japanese cyclist
, Japanese swimmer
, Japanese actor
Tadashi Ehara, American game designer
Yukiko Ehara, Japanese model, television personality, singer and actress

Japanese-language surnames